The Mas-Wrestling Federation of Armenia, is the regulating body of mas-wrestling in Armenia, governed by the Armenian Olympic Committee. The headquarters of the federation is located in Yerevan.

History
The Mas-Wrestling Federation of Armenia is currently led by president Artavazd Nalbandyan. The Federation oversees the training of mas-wrestling specialists and organizes Armenia's participation in European and international level mas-wrestling competitions, including the Mas-Wrestling World Cup. The Federation also organizes national tournaments such as the "Armenian Mas-Wrestling Championships". The Federation is a full member of the International Mas-Wrestling Federation, within the "European Confederation".

Activities 
In 2015, the Mas-Wrestling World Cup and the European Championships were held in Armenia, where the Armenia national team came in second place in the team competitions, 37 countries participated in the events.

See also 
 Sport in Armenia
 Wrestling Federation of Armenia
 Wrestling in Armenia

References

External links 
Mas-Wrestling Federation of Armenia on Facebook

Sports governing bodies in Armenia
Wrestling in Armenia